A list of the English-language Earthdawn books with their SKU numbers. Earthdawn has also had German, French, Japanese  and Polish editions.

Earthdawn was created and published by FASA Corporation from 1993 to 1999. This is known as the First Edition. The license was subsequently picked up by three companies, the first two being Living Room Games, who published the Second Edition from 2001 to 2006, and RedBrick, who published a revised First Edition termed Earthdawn Classic from 2005 to 2008 and a Third Edition from 2009 until 2012. FASA Games Inc., a wholly owned subsidiary of FASA Corporation, announced a Fourth Edition via Kickstarter in 2013, released in 2014. The third company to utilize the Earthdawn IP under license from FASA was Vagrant Workshop, who published the Age of Legend edition in 2016.

FASA Releases - First Edition
 Earthdawn Game System. 6000 (hardcover) / 6001 (softcover)
 Earthdawn Gamemaster Pack. 6002
 Barsaive (boxed set). 6100
 Denizens of Earthdawn, Volume 1. 6101
 Denizens of Earthdawn, Volume 2. 6102
 Legends of Earthdawn, Volume 1. 6103
 Parlainth: The Forgotten City (boxed set). 6104
 Creatures of Barsaive. 6105
 The Adept's Way. 6106
 Horrors. 6107
 Sky Point & Vivane (boxed set). 6108
 Serpent River. 6109
 The Book of Exploration. Legends of Earthdawn, Volume 2. 6110
 Throal: The Dwarf Kingdom. 6111
 Earthdawn Survival Guide. 6112
 The Blood Wood. 6113
 The Theran Empire. 6114
 Secret Societies of Barsaive. 6115
 Crystal Raiders of Barsaive. 6116
 Ork Nation of Cara Fahd. 6117
 Earthdawn Companion. 6200.
 Magic: A Manual of Mystic Secrets. 6201.
 Arcane Mysteries of Barsaive. 6202.
 Mists of Betrayal. 6301
 Terror in the Skies. 6302
 Infected. 6303
 Parlainth Adventures. 6304
 Shattered Pattern. 6305
 Sky Point Adventures. 6306
 Blades. 6307
 Throal Adventures. 6308
 Prelude to War. 6401
 Earthdawn novels (see below).
  3 Promo-Flyers

Living Room Games Releases - First Edition
 Path of Deception. LRG-100. 
 Barsaive at War. LRG-101.

Living Room Games Releases - Second Edition
 Earthdawn Rulebook, Second Edition. LRG-200. 
 Earthdawn Companion. LRG-201. 
 Barsaive in Chaos. LRG-202. 
 The Gamemaster's Screen. LRG-203. 
 Scourge Unending. LRG ED-204. .
 Way of War: Makers of Legend Vol 1. LRG-205. 
 The Book of Dragons. LRG-206. 
 The Wanderer’s Way: Makers of Legend Vol. 2. LRG-207. 
 Dangerous Goods. LRG-208. Unpublished
 Way of Will: Makers of Legend Vol. 3. LRG-209. Unpublished

RedBrick Releases - Classic Edition
 Earthdawn Player's Compendium. RBL-100.
 Earthdawn Gamemaster's Compendium. RBL-101.
 Earthdawn Character Folio. RBL-102.
 Earthdawn Adventure Log. RBL-103.
 Earthdawn Name-giver's Compendium. RBL-200.
 Nations of Barsaive: Volume One. RBL-201
 Kratas: City of Thieves. RBL-202
 Ardanyan's Revenge. RBL-300.
 Earthdawn Adventure Compendium. RBL-301.
 Burning Desires. RBL-302.
 Shards Collection: Volume One. RBL-303.
 Kaer Tardim. RBL-500.
 Character Record Sheets. RBL-501.
 Spell Library. RBL-502.
 Spell Design. RBL-503.
 Discipline Design. RBL-504.
 Barsaive Map. RBL-505.
 Rites of Protection and Passage. RBL-506.
 Kratas Character Codex. RBL-507.
 Journey to Lang: An Earthdawn Shard. RBL-700.
 Runvir's Tomb: An Earthdawn Shard. RBL-701.
 Kept in the Dark: An Earthdawn Shard. RBL-702.
 Pale River: An Earthdawn Shard. RBL-703.
 Tournament Troubles: An Earthdawn Shard. RBL-704.
 Blackout: An Earthdawn Shard. RBL-705.
 Betrayal's Sting: An Earthdawn Shard. RBL-706.
 Westhrall's Passage: An Earthdawn Shard. RBL-707
 A Tear for Jaspree: An Earthdawn Shard. RBL-708
 FASA eBooks.
 Earthdawn novels (see below).

RedBrick also published Savage Worlds editions of some Earthdawn books:
 Earthdawn Player's Guide (Savage Worlds Edition) [RB12001], 2012.
 Earthdawn Game Master's Guide (Savage Worlds Edition) [RB12002], 2012.

RedBrick Releases - Third Edition

Corebooks
 Earthdawn Player's Guide. MGP6141
 Earthdawn Gamemaster's Guide. MGP6142
 Earthdawn Player's Companion. MGP6147
 Earthdawn Gamemaster's Companion. MGP6148
 Misguided Ambitions - An Introduction to Earthdawn.

Sourcebooks
 Kratas: City of Thieves. MGP6150
 Namegivers of Barsaive. MGP6151
 Nations of Barsaive 1: Throal. MGP6158
 Nations of Barsaive 2: Serpent River. MGP6159
 Nations of Barsaive 3: Cara Fahd. MGP6189
 Nations of Barsaive 4: Crystal Raiders. MGP6198
 Cathay: The Five Kingdoms Player's Guide. MGP 6175
 Cathay: The Five Kingdoms Gamemaster's Guide MGP 6176

Adventures
 Ardanyan's Revenge. MGP6153
 Shards Collection Volume One. MGP6154
 Shards Collection Volume Two. MGP6166
 Kratas Adventures. MGP6170
 Burning Desires. MGP6191

(RedBrick Third Edition releases were published under the Flaming Cobra Imprint of Mongoose Publishing)

RedBrick/FASA Games Releases - Revised Third Edition

Corebooks
 Earthdawn Player's Guide. FAS11001P

Sourcebooks
 Mists of Betrayal. FAS11101P

FASA Games Releases - Fourth Edition

Corebooks
 Earthdawn Quick Start, FAS14100
 Earthdawn Player's Guide, FAS14101
 Earthdawn Gamemaster's Guide, FAS14102
 Earthdawn Player's Companion, FAS14103
 Earthdawn Game Master's Screen, FAS14104
 Earthdawn Character Journal, FAS14105
 Earthdawn PDF Fillable Form Character Journal, FAS14106

Sourcebooks
 Travar: The Merchant City, FAS14201
 Elven Nations, FAS14202
 Questors, FAS14203
 The Adept's Journey: Mystic Paths, FAS14204
Iopos: Lair of Deceit, FAS14205
Empty Thrones, FAS14206

Adventures
 Legends of Barsaive 00A: Characters, FAS14401
 Legends of Barsaive 00: Haven, FAS14402
 Legends of Barsaive 01: Toys in the Attic, FAS14403
 Legends of Barsaive 02: Lip Service, FAS14404
 Legends of Barsaive 03: Separation Anxiety, FAS14405
 Legends of Barsaive 04: That Which Was Lost, FAS14406
 Legends of Barsaive 05: Games of the Hungry, FAS14407
 Legends of Barsaive 06: Glass Houses, FAS14408
 Legends of Barsaive 07: Heavy Metal Queen, FAS14409
Legends of Barsaive 08: Brain Scratch, FAS14410
Legends of Barsaive: Haven Volume 1, FAS14601

Vagrant Workshop Releases - The Age of Legend Edition

Corebook
 Earthdawn: The Age of Legend, v20160428

Sourcebook & Adventures 
 Darranis: Details the town of Darranis, and provides three adventures in Darranis and its surrounding environs.

Novels
 Christopher Kubasik
 The Longing Ring, 1993, 
 Mother Speaks, 1994, 
 Poisoned Memories, 1994, 
 Sam Lewis (editor), Talisman: A Short Story Anthology, 1994, 
 Carl Sargent & Marc Gascoigne, Shroud of Madness, 1995, 
 Greg Gorden, Prophecy, 1994, 
 Nigel D. Findley, Lost Kaer, 1998 
Jak Koke, Liferock: A Lost Novel of Earthdawn, 2003, Liferock: An Earthdawn Novel, 2010, RedBrick
 Caroline Spector, Immortals trilogy:Since the original Earthdawn novel series was canceled as the books were being written, the first two were first published as French and German translations in the 1990s.
Scars: A Lost Novel of Earthdawn, 2005, Scars: An Earthdawn Novel, 2010, RedBrick
 Little Treasures 
 Worlds Without End, 1995,  & 2003, as the 18th Shadowrun novel.
 Tim Jones, Anarya's Secret, 2007, RedBrick
 Hank Woon, Cathay:
 Dark Shadows of Yesterday, 2008, RedBrick
 Immortal Twilight, 2009, RedBrick
 Donovan Winch, Defiler's Curse, 2011, RedBrick

References 

Earthdawn
Earthdawn
Earthdawn